Ilham Abali (born 19 February 2002) is a Dutch footballer who plays as a midfielder for ADO Den Haag in the Eredivisie.

Club career

International career

Personal life
Abali was born in Vlissingen.

Honours

Club

International

References

Living people
Dutch women's footballers
Eredivisie (women) players
2002 births
Women's association football midfielders
ADO Den Haag (women) players